WAMY may refer to:

World Assembly of Muslim Youth
WZDX-DT2, a television station licensed to Huntsville, Alabama, United States, also known as WAMY-TV
WAMY (AM), a radio station (1580 AM) licensed to Amory, Mississippi, United States
WAMY, ICAO code for Pogogul Airport